Strange Experiment is a 1937 British drama film directed by Albert Parker and starring Donald Gray, Ann Wemyss and Mary Newcomb. It was an adaptation of the play Two Worlds by John Golden and Hubert Osborne. It was made at Wembley Studios as a quota quickie by the British subsidiary of Fox Film.

Cast
 Donald Gray as James Martin 
 Ann Wemyss as Joan Bauer 
 Mary Newcomb as Helen Rollins 
 Ronald Ward as Michael Waring 
 Henri De Vries as Professor Bauer 
 Alastair Sim as 'Pop' Lawler 
 James Carew as Doctor Rollins 
 Henry Caine as Sergeant Cox 
 Eric Hales as Carter 
 Joana Pereira as Miss Bauer 
 Arnold Bell as Leech 
 Lillian Talbot as Mrs Barker

References

Bibliography
 Chibnall, Steve. Quota Quickies: The Birth of the British 'B' Film. British Film Institute, 2007.
 Low, Rachael. Filmmaking in 1930s Britain. George Allen & Unwin, 1985.
 Wood, Linda. British Films, 1927-1939. British Film Institute, 1986.

External links

1937 films
1937 drama films
Films directed by Albert Parker
British films based on plays
British drama films
British black-and-white films
1930s English-language films
1930s British films
Quota quickies
Films shot at Wembley Studios
20th Century Fox films